Vittorio Torcellan (born 9 August 1962) is an Italian lightweight rower. He won a gold medal at the 1985 World Rowing Championships in Hazewinkel with the lightweight men's eight.

References

1962 births
Living people
Italian male rowers
World Rowing Championships medalists for Italy